Welcome to Pine Hill is a 2012 American drama film written and directed by Keith Miller and starring Shanon Harper.

Reception
The film has an 86% rating on Rotten Tomatoes.  Nick McCarthy of Slant Magazine awarded the film two and a half stars out of four.

References

External links
 
 
 

American drama films
2010s English-language films
2010s American films